Begleri (Greek: μπεγλέρι) is a small skill toy consisting of one or more beads at either end of a short string or chain. It can be flipped and twirled around the fingers to perform tricks. The begleri originated in Greece, and was originally derived from the komboloi, which serves the function of worry beads, and are often flipped around to pass the time or keep the hands busy. While komboloia have beads forming a closed circle, begleri beads are threaded on an open strand, usually in a symmetrical formation, with equal weighting at either end; this is sometimes referred to as "open-string begleri". Begleria come in many forms, consisting of semi-precious stone or metal beads. They can be similar in form to the percussion instrument kashaka, but are much smaller in size.

Modern revival 
Historically, begleri was associated with the Greek mangas subculture, and the rebetiko style of music, popular until the 1960s. In recent years, begleri has grown in popularity outside of Greece, as a skill toy and everyday carry item. This has led to a proliferation of begleri designs and styles, using all manner of modern materials. The recent uptick in interest among collectors and skill toy enthusiasts dates back to at least the early 2010s, when it began gaining popularity on hobbyist sites. As the popularity grew in online forums and social media, different styles of play began to emerge. A wide range of different styles of play and categories of tricks have developed, many of which can only be performed with relatively long-stringed begleri, termed "long game" by enthusiasts. 

Due to the nature of play, begleri have shifted from traditional ornate beads to simpler performance-oriented beads. Two common begleri types are monkey-fist "beads", made from paracord, and solid beads, which can be made of metal (aluminum, steel, titanium), acrylic resin, Delrin, or wood. Monkey-fist begleri are commonly made by people beginning to practice "slinging", the common term for begleri manipulation; solid type beads are becoming more and more common, and there are few companies that are developing new geometries of beads based on feedback from consumers.

In popular culture 
Axel Schönberg, a character in John M. Green's thriller novel The Trusted (2013), is almost always twirling a set of gold begleri in his fingers. In the NBC show Debris, the character Anson Ash, played by Scroobius Pip, can be seen slinging begleri in several scenes of season 1, episode 5.

References

Physical activity and dexterity toys
Greek culture